Empire Earth Mobile is a turn-based strategy video game for the cell phone, based on the original Empire Earth. Empire Earth Mobile was written in Java form, and was developed by WonderPhone instead of Stainless Steel Studios (the makers of Empire Earth). It was released on October 14, 2005 by mobile games distributor WonderPhone.

Gameplay
Empire Earth Mobile is turn-based strategy game. The game covers four epochs; Stone, Middle, Modern and Nano. The game separates itself from the other Empire Earth games with the absence of citizens. Instead, certain symbols lie on the map which can be conquered by a soldier unit. When they are, a new building can be created. However, only a certain number of symbols exist on the map, so each side competes for control of them.

Mobile gives the player control of four types of units, each that varies and changes in different epochs. The standard soldier, which can be useful for building new structures, ranged units, heavy support units, and aerial units. The latter of the four is only available in later epochs.

Mobile has three game modes: adventure, skirmish and multiplayer. Adventure mode takes the player though 10 campaign levels, totaling 2,000 years of human history. It begins in the Prehistory and finishes in the Nano age, similar to Empire Earth. Skirmish is a free-for-all solo battle, with multiplayer mode introducing the possibility of two player combat.

Development
Mobile, upon release, was the seventh Vivendi title to be ported and the one of three that year based on major franchises.

Reception
Mobile was well received. IGN gave it a 7.4 out of 10, and commented "Empire Earth Mobile is a slower paced mobile game that's not exactly suited for quick pick-up-and-play sessions." but "If you are looking for a mobile game, though, that is decidedly meatier than, say, solitaire or Tetris, Empire Earth Mobile does offer some solid play." Mobile gamer said "In short, Empire Earth is an interesting new take on strategy" and "it's not difficult to recommend."

References

External links
Empire Earth Mobile at GameSpot

Empire Earth
2005 video games
Mobile games
Panhistorical video games
Turn-based strategy video games
Java platform games
J2ME games

de:Empire Earth#Empire Earth Mobile